The 2018 Royal Bank Cup was the 48th Canadian junior A Ice Hockey National Championship for the Canadian Junior Hockey League and the 48th consecutive year a national championship was awarded to this skill level since the breakaway of Major Junior hockey in 1970.  The tournament was played at the Prospera Centre in Chilliwack, British Columbia.

Teams
Chilliwack Chiefs (Host)
Regular Season: 26-26-3-3 (4th BCHL Mainland Division)
Playoffs: Lost 3-4 Prince George Spruce Kings
Playoffs Record: 3 wins - 4 losses
Wenatchee Wild (Pacific)
Regular Season: 37-16-4-1 (3rd BCHL Interior Division)
Playoffs: Won 1st Rd 4-0 Merritt Centennials - Won 2nd Rd 4-2 Vernon VipersWon Semi Final 4-1 Trail Smoke Eaters - Won BCHL 4-1 Prince George Spruce KingsWon Doyle Cup 4-1 Spruce Grove Saints
Playoffs Record: 20 wins - 5 losses
Steinbach Pistons (Western)
Regular Season: 48-8-2-2 (1st MJHL)
Playoffs: Won Quarter-finals 4-0 Swan Valley Stampeders - Won Semi-finals 4-2 Winnipeg Blues - Won MJHL 4-2 Virden Oil Capitals
Won ANAVET Cup 4-2 Nipawin Hawks
Playoffs Record: 16 win - 6 losses
Wellington Dukes (Central)
Regular Season: 33-13-3-5 (1st OJHL East Division)
Playoffs: Won N-E Quarters 4-3 Pickering Panthers - Won N-E Semis 4-3 Newmarket Hurricanes  Won N-E Finals 4-1 Aurora Tigers - Won OJHL 4-2 Georgetown Raiders
Dudley Hewitt Cup: Round Robin 2 wins 1 loss -third place - Won Semifinal game 6-3 Thunder Bay North StarsWon Championship Game 7-4 Dryden Ice Dogs
Playoffs Record: 20 wins - 10 losses
Ottawa Jr. Senators (Eastern)
Regular Season: 46-9-5-2 (1st CCHL Yzerman Division)
Playoffs: Won Quarter-Finals 4-2 Pembroke Lumber Kings - Won Semi-Finals 4-3 Brockville Braves - Won CCHL 4-1 Carleton Place Canadians
Fred Page Cup: Round Robin 2 wins 1 overtime win -first place - Won Championship Game 10-1 Longueuil College Francais
Playoffs Record: 15 wins - 7 losses

Tournament

Round-robin

Schedule and results 

All games played at Prospera Centre

Semifinals results

Final results

Awards
Roland Mercier Trophy (Tournament MVP): Will Calverley Chilliwack Chiefs
Top Forward: Jasper Weatherby Wenatchee Wild
Top Defencemen: Darby Gula Steinbach Pistons
Top Goaltender: Daniel Chenard Chilliwack Chiefs
Tubby Schmalz Trophy (Sportsmanship): Zach Salloum Ottawa Jr. Senators
Top Scorer: Jasper Weatherby Wenatchee Wild

Roll of League Champions
AJHL: Spruce Grove Saints
BCHL: Wenatchee Wild
CCHL: Ottawa Jr. Senators
MHL: Edmundston Blizzard
MJHL: Steinbach Pistons
NOJHL: Cochrane Crunch
OJHL: Wellington Dukes
QJHL: Longueuil Collège Français
SJHL: Nipawin Hawks
SIJHL: Dryden Ice Dogs

References

External links
2018 Royal Bank Cup Website

Royal Bank Cup 2018
Canadian Junior Hockey League national championships
Royal Bank Cup 2018
Royal Bank Cup 2018